The 2009–10 UEFA Champions League was the 55th season of Europe's premier club football tournament organised by UEFA, and the 18th under the current UEFA Champions League format. The final was played on 22 May 2010, at the Santiago Bernabéu Stadium, home of Real Madrid, in Madrid, Spain. The final was won by Italian club Inter Milan, who beat German side Bayern Munich 2–0. Inter Milan went on to represent Europe in the 2010 FIFA Club World Cup, beating Congolese side TP Mazembe 3–0 in the final, and played in the 2010 UEFA Super Cup against Europa League winners Atlético Madrid, losing 2–0.

Barcelona were the defending champions, but they were eliminated by eventual winners Inter Milan in the semi-finals.

Association team allocation
A total of 76 teams participated in the 2009–10 Champions League, from 52 UEFA associations (Liechtenstein organises no domestic league competition). Associations are allocated places according to their 2008 UEFA country coefficient, which takes into account their performance in European competitions from 2003–04 to 2007–08.

Below is the qualification scheme for the 2009–10 UEFA Champions League:
Associations 1–3 each have four teams qualify
Associations 4–6 each have three teams qualify
Associations 7–15 each have two teams qualify
Associations 16–53 each have one team qualify (except Liechtenstein)

Association ranking

Distribution
Since the winners of the 2008–09 UEFA Champions League, Barcelona, obtained a place in the group stage through their domestic league placing, the reserved title holder spot in the group stage was effectively vacated. To compensate:
 The champions of association 13 (Belgium) were promoted from the third qualifying round to the group stage.
 The champions of association 16 (Switzerland) were promoted from the second qualifying round to the third qualifying round.
 The champions of associations 48 and 49 (Faroe Islands and Luxembourg) were promoted from the first qualifying round to the second qualifying round.

Teams
League positions of the previous season shown in parentheses.

TH Title Holder

Round and draw dates
All draws held at UEFA headquarters in Nyon, Switzerland unless stated otherwise.

Qualifying rounds

In a new system for the Champions League, there are two separate qualifying tournaments. The Champions Path (which start from the first qualifying round) is for clubs which won their domestic league and did not automatically qualify for the group stage, while the Non-Champions Path (which start from the third qualifying round) is for clubs which did not win their domestic league and did not automatically qualify for the group stage.

In the qualifying phase and the play-off round, teams play against each other over two legs on a home-and-away basis.

The draw for the first and second qualifying rounds, conducted by UEFA President Michel Platini and UEFA General Secretary David Taylor, was held on 22 June 2009, and the draw for the third qualifying round, conducted by UEFA Competitions Director Giorgio Marchetti and Head of Club Competitions Michael Heselschwerdt, was held on 17 July 2009. For the draws, clubs were separated into seeded and unseeded teams based on their club coefficient. Because the draws for the second and third qualifying rounds took place before the previous round was completed, the teams were seeded assuming the seeded side in the previous round would be victorious.

First qualifying round
The first legs were played on 30 June and 1 July, and the second legs were played on 7 and 8 July 2009.

Second qualifying round
The first legs were played on 14 and 15 July, and the second legs were played on 21 and 22 July 2009.

Partizan's 8–0 win over Rhyl in the second leg equalled the record for the largest margin of victory in the current Champions League format.

, the second leg between Stabæk and Tirana was under investigation by UEFA and German authorities for possible match-fixing.

Third qualifying round
The third qualifying round was split into two separate sections: one for champions and one for non-champions. The first legs were played on 28 and 29 July, and the second legs were played on 4 and 5 August 2009. The losing teams in both sections entered the play-off round of the 2009–10 UEFA Europa League.

Play-off round

An extra qualifying round, the play-off round, was introduced from this season. The teams were split into two separate sections: one for champions and one for non-champions. The draw for the play-off round, conducted by UEFA General Secretary David Taylor and UEFA Competitions Director Giorgio Marchetti, was held on 7 August 2009. For the draw, clubs were separated into seeded and unseeded teams based on their club coefficient. The first legs were played on 18 and 19 August, and the second legs were played on 25 and 26 August 2009. The losing teams in both sections entered the group stage of the 2009–10 UEFA Europa League.

Group stage

The draw for the group stage was held at the Grimaldi Forum in Monaco on 27 August 2009. A total of 32 teams were drawn into eight groups of four. Teams were divided into four pots, based on their club coefficient. Clubs from the same pot or the same association cannot be drawn into the same group.

In each group, teams played against each other home-and-away. The matchdays were 15–16 September, 29–30 September, 20–21 October, 3–4 November, 24–25 November, and 8–9 December 2009. The top two in each group advanced to the knockout phase, and the third-placed teams entered the round of 32 of the 2009–10 UEFA Europa League.

Based on Article 7.06 in the UEFA regulations, if two or more teams are equal on points on completion of the group matches, the following criteria are applied to determine the rankings:
higher number of points obtained in the group matches played among the teams in question;
superior goal difference from the group matches played among the teams in question;
higher number of goals scored away from home in the group matches played among the teams in question;
superior goal difference from all group matches played;
higher number of goals scored;
higher number of coefficient points accumulated by the club in question, as well as its association, over the previous five seasons.

AZ, Wolfsburg, Standard Liège, Zürich, APOEL, Rubin Kazan, Unirea Urziceni and Debrecen made their debut in the group stage.

Group A

Group B

Group C

Group D

Group E

Group F

Group G

Group H

Knockout phase

In the knockout phase, teams play against each other over two legs on a home-and-away basis, except for the one-match final.

The draw for the round of 16 was held on 18 December 2009, conducted by UEFA General Secretary Gianni Infantino and Giorgio Marchetti, the UEFA Director of Competitions. The eight group winners, which would play the second leg at home, were drawn against the eight group runners-up, with the restriction that teams from the same group or the same association cannot be drawn with each other.

The draws for the quarter-finals, semi-finals and final (to determine the "home" team) was held on 19 March 2010, conducted by Gianni Infantino and Emilio Butragueño, the ambassador for the final in Madrid. From the quarter-finals onwards, there were no seedings, and teams from the same group or the same association may be drawn with each other.

Bracket

Round of 16
Starting from this season, the matches in the round of 16 were held over four weeks, instead of the previous two weeks. The first legs were played on 16, 17, 23 and 24 February, and the second legs were played on 9, 10, 16 and 17 March 2010.

|}

Quarter-finals
The first legs were played on 30 and 31 March, and the second legs were played on 6 and 7 April 2010.

|}

Semi-finals
The first legs were played on 20 and 21 April, and the second legs were played on 27 and 28 April 2010.

|}

Final

The final of the 2009–10 UEFA Champions League was played at the Santiago Bernabéu Stadium in Madrid on 22 May 2010, between Germany's Bayern Munich and Italy's Inter Milan. The stadium, home of Real Madrid, has hosted three previous European Cup finals, in 1957, 1969 and 1980. It was the first time that a UEFA Champions League final has been played on a Saturday night. England's Howard Webb was appointed to referee the Final. The two clubs competing in the Final had each won their domestic league and cup competitions, meaning that the winner became only the sixth club in Europe to have achieved a continental treble, and the first such club from their respective countries. It was also the second consecutive treble, following that of Barcelona in the previous season.

Statistics
Statistics exclude qualifying rounds and play-off round.

Top goalscorers

Source: Top Scorers – Final – Saturday 22 May 2010 (after match) . Retrieved 23 April 2010

Top assists

Source:

See also
2009–10 UEFA Europa League
2010 FIFA Club World Cup
2010 UEFA Super Cup
2009–10 UEFA Women's Champions League

References

External links

2009–10 All matches – season at UEFA website
2009–10 UEFA Champions League, UEFA.com
UEFA Executive Committee approves changes to UEFA club competitions (includes access list for this competition)
Access list 2009/2010 (UEFA European Cup Football by Bert Kassies)
 All scorers 2009–10 UEFA Champions League (excluding qualifying round) according to protocols UEFA + all scorers qualifying round
 2009/10 UEFA Champions League - results and line-ups (archive)

 
1
2009-10